The Best of Tracy Lawrence is the first compilation album by American country music artist Tracy Lawrence. It is a compilation of songs previously released on his first four studio albums. The track "Her Old Stompin' Ground" was not previously included on any of his albums.

Track listing

Personnel

Flip Anderson - piano
Eddie Bayers - drums
Bruce Bouton - steel guitar
Dennis Burnside - Hammond organ, piano
Larry Byrom - acoustic guitar
Mark Casstevens - acoustic guitar, harmonica
Deryl Dodd - background vocals
Paul Franklin - Dobro, steel guitar, pedabro
Sonny Garrish - steel guitar
Rob Hajacos - fiddle
Tony Harrell - keyboards, piano
Dann Huff - electric guitar
Tracy Lawrence - lead vocals
Chris Leuzinger - electric guitar
Terry McMillan - harmonica, percussion
Liana Manis - background vocals
Brent Mason - electric guitar
Steve Nathan - keyboards, piano
Dave Pomeroy - bass guitar
Brent Rowan - electric guitar, mandolin
John Wesley Ryles - background vocals
Hank Singer - fiddle
Milton Sledge - drums
Gary Smith - keyboards, piano, synthesizer
Joe Spivey - fiddle, acoustic guitar
James Stroud - drums, percussion
Willie Weeks - bass guitar
Dennis Wilson - background vocals
Lonnie Wilson - drums
Glenn Worf - bass guitar
Curtis Wright - background vocals
Curtis Young - background vocals

Chart performance

References

Tracy Lawrence albums
1998 greatest hits albums
Atlantic Records compilation albums